TFU is a three-letter acronym that can stand for:
 Chengdu Tianfu International Airport
 Terra Force Fighting Unit
 Task Force Uruzgan, a Dutch reconstruction team in Afghanistan
 Three Forms of Unity, a collective name for the Belgic Confession, the Canons of Dort, and the Heidelberg Catechism. Also "3FU"
 Tin Fu stop, Hong Kong (MTR station code)
 Training for Utopia, a metalcore and industrial metal band from 1996—2000
 A Tactical Firearms Unit of British police forces 
 Transformers Universe (disambiguation), multiple uses
 Star Wars: The Force Unleashed (project), a 2008 multi-media project
 Star Wars: The Force Unleashed, the video game component of the eponymous multimedia project
 Star Wars: The Force Unleashed II, the sequel to the above game component of the eponymous multi-media project